John May may refer to:

Business
 John May (angel investor), manager of Business Angel investment groups
 John May (shipwright), English shipwright in Dutch service
 John May (youth worker) (born 1964), chief executive of Career Academies UK and member of the World Scout Committee
 John C. May, president and CEO of John Deere

Clergy
 John May (bishop) (died 1598), Bishop of Carlisle
 John May (priest) (died 1893), Dean of St George's Cathedral, Georgetown, Guyana
 John L. May (1922–1994), Archbishop of St Louis

Politics
 John May (Australian politician) (1844–1917), member of the Queensland Legislative Assembly
 John May (North Carolina politician) (1950–2017), member of the North Carolina legislature

Sport
 Jack May (tennis) (1925–2012), Australian tennis player
 John May (Australian footballer) (born 1951), Australian footballer who played for Essendon
 John May (cricketer) (1849–?), English cricketer
 John May (footballer, born 1878) (1878–1933), footballer who played for Rangers FC

Other
 John May (1744–1790), founder of Maysville, Kentucky
 John May (gangster), car mechanic for the Moran gang, killed in the Saint Valentine's Day Massacre
 John May (judge) (1923–1997), British judge who headed the May Inquiry into "Maguire Seven" miscarriage of justice
 John May (Medal of Honor) (1836–1886), American soldier and Medal of Honor recipient
 John May (police officer) (1775–1856), superintendent in the London Metropolitan Police
 John Wilder May, American judge
 John May (V), episode of the 2009 miniseries V

See also
 Johnny May, Canadian Inuk bush pilot
 May (surname)
 Jack May (1922–1997), English actor
 J. Peter May (Jon Peter May, born 1939), American mathematician